Modiga mindre män is a 1965 Swedish children's film written and directed by Leif Krantz. It won a Special Jury Prize at the Venice Film Festival.

External links 
 

Swedish children's films
Venice Grand Jury Prize winners
1960s Swedish films